Gunther of Pairis  (c. 1150 – c. 1220) was a German Cistercian monk and author, writing in Latin.

His best-known work is his Historia Constantinopolitana about the Fourth Crusade, in a mixture of prose and verse. It was based on the account of Martin of Pairis, abbot of Pairis Abbey, and includes the siege and looting of Constantinople. His is the only western account to state explicitly that the crusaders pillaged Greek churches, as the other accounts were written by the pillagers themselves, such as Geoffrey of Villehardouin, who wrote The Conquest of Constantinople.

Gunther also wrote Solimarius, about the First Crusade, and Ligurinus, an epic about Frederick Barbarossa.

References
 Andrea, Alfred (ed.), 1997: The Capture of Constantinople: The ‘Historia Constantinopolitana’ of Gunther of Pairis

Notes

External links
Crusades Encyclopedia
Bibliography 

 Documenta Catholica Omnia: Guntheri Cisterciensis Opera Omnia

13th-century German poets
German Cistercians
German chroniclers
13th-century German historians
1150s births
1220s deaths
Fourth Crusade
German male poets
Medieval writers about the Crusades
13th-century Latin writers
12th-century German historians